Jon Kenton Court (born November 26, 1960 in Gainesville, Florida) is an American jockey in Thoroughbred horse racing.

Having grown up in Florida, Jon Court began riding in Colorado at the now closed Centennial Park in 1980.  He rode in Louisiana for 12 years before moving to Kentucky and Indiana in 1995, where he was a top rider at Hoosier Park from 1996 to 1998.  In 1999, he gained his 2,000th win at Kentucky Downs.

In 2001, he rode Percy Hope in the Lone Star Derby, winning, and in the Preakness Stakes, placing 9th. In 2003, he won the Japan Cup Dirt on Fleetstreet Dancer as a 48-1 longshot.

In 2004, he moved to California tracks on the advice of trainer Doug O'Neill after winning titles at Ellis Park Racecourse, Oaklawn Park, Turfway Park, Kentucky Downs, and Birmingham Racecourse.  He rode his 3,000th winner at Santa Anita Park on April 7, 2005, 25 years to the day from his first win.

In 2006, Court was elected secretary of the Jockeys' Guild and is the Guild's representative board member for the National Thoroughbred Racing Association's (NTRA) Charities-Permanently Disabled Jockeys' Fund.

Court, who has been called "an unfailingly polite man" by ESPN, received the prestigious George Woolf Memorial Jockey Award in February 2007. The award is voted on by American jockeys and is given to a jockey who demonstrates high standards of personal and professional conduct, on and off the racetrack.

Court was one of the jockeys featured in the first season of Animal Planet's 2009 reality documentary Jockeys before he moved his tack back to Kentucky.

On April 10, 2010, Court won the $1,000,000 Arkansas Derby aboard Line of David, giving the horse and its connections enough graded stakes earnings to run in the Kentucky Derby. However, Court was removed from the Derby mount by the horse's trainer, John Sadler. Line of David subsequently finished 18th in the 20-horse Derby field.

Court repeated his win in the Arkansas Derby in 2011 with Archarcharch, trained by his father-in-law, Jinks Fires.  He retained the mount for the 2011 Kentucky Derby.  Archarcharch drew the first post and finished 15th in a 19-horse field at 12-1 odds.

Court was injured in a fall on May 3, 2014, breaking his hand. He did not return to the track until late September.

On December 3, 2016, Court earned his 4,000th win aboard City Without Pity at Turfway Park. He had suffered three broken vertebrae and two broken ribs on September 16 when his mount clipped heals with another horse.

Year-end charts

References

 Jon Court at the NTRA
 Jockeys Guild Jon Court

1960 births
Living people
American jockeys
People from Gainesville, Florida